The Army Black Knights football team, previously known as the Army Cadets, represents the United States Military Academy in college football. Army is a Division I Football Bowl Subdivision (FBS) member of the NCAA. The Black Knights play home games in Michie Stadium with a capacity of 38,000 at West Point, New York. The Black Knights are coached by Jeff Monken who is in his ninth season as head coach. Army claims three national championships from 1944 to 1946. In addition, major selectors have awarded Army championships in 1914 and 1916. Army has produced 24 players and 4 coaches in the College Football Hall of Fame, 37 consensus All-Americans, and 3 Heisman Trophy winners.

With the exception of seven seasons (1998–2004) where the team was a member of Conference USA, Army has competed as an independent, meaning that they have no affiliation with any conference. As of the 2022 college football season, Army is one of seven FBS schools whose football teams do not belong to any conference, the others being BYU, Liberty, New Mexico State, Notre Dame, UConn, and UMass. However, for all other sports Army is primarily a member of the Patriot League.

Three players from Army have won the Heisman Trophy: Doc Blanchard (1945), Glenn Davis (1946), and Pete Dawkins (1958).

The three major service academies—Air Force, Army, and Navy—compete for the Commander-in-Chief's Trophy, which is awarded to the academy that defeats the others in football that year (or retained by the previous year's winner in the event of a three-way tie). Army has won nine CIC Trophies, most recently in 2020.

History

Army's football program began on November 29, 1890, when Navy challenged the cadets to a game of the relatively new sport. Navy defeated Army at West Point that year, but Army avenged the loss in Annapolis the following year. The academies still clash every December in what is traditionally the last regular-season Division I college-football game. The 2016 Army–Navy Game marked Army's first recent win after fourteen consecutive losses to Navy. From 1944 to 1950, the Cadets had 57 wins, 3 losses and 4 ties. During this time span, Army won three national championships.

Army's football team reached its pinnacle of success during the Second World War under coach Earl Blaik when Army won three consecutive national championships in 1944, 1945 and 1946, and produced three Heisman trophy winners: Doc Blanchard (1945), Glenn Davis (1946) and Pete Dawkins (1958). Past NFL coaches Vince Lombardi and Bill Parcells were Army assistant coaches early in their careers.

The football team plays its home games at Michie Stadium, where the playing field is named after Earl Blaik. Cadets attendance is mandatory at football games and the Corps stands for the duration of the game. At all home games, one of the four regiments marches onto the field in formation before the team takes the field and leads the crowd in traditional Army cheers.

For many years, Army teams were known as the "Cadets." In the 1940s, several papers called the football team "the Black Knights of the Hudson." From then on, "Cadets" and "Black Knights" were used interchangeably until 1999, when the team was officially nicknamed the Black Knights.

Between the 1998 and 2004 seasons, Army's football program was a member of Conference USA, but starting with the 2005 season Army reverted to its former independent status. Army competes with Navy and Air Force
for the Commander-in-Chief's Trophy.

National championships
Army has won five national championships from NCAA-designated major selectors. Army claims the 1944, 1945, and 1946 titles. In addition, Army was selected by four major selectors in 1914 and one major selector in 1916. Charles Daly was the head coach of both teams.

Lambert Trophy
The Lambert-Meadowlands Trophy (known as the Lambert Trophy), established in 1936, is an annual award given to the best team in the East in Division I FBS (formerly I-A) college football and is presented by the Metropolitan New York Football Writers. Army has won the Lambert Trophy nine times; seven times under head coach Earl "Red" Blaik in the 1940s and 1950s, and twice under head coach Jeff Monken in 2018 and 2020.

Bowl games
Army has played in ten bowl games. They have a record of 7–3.

Future bowl tie-ins
The NCAA's football oversight committee determined the number of primary bowl tie-ins for each FBS conference and FBS independent for the 2020–2025 bowl cycle using eligibility data from the 2014–2017 seasons. The Black Knights received one guaranteed tie-in per year. On October 24, 2019, the West Point Athletic Department announced that they had agreed to a contract that placed their team, if eligible, in the Independence Bowl for three of the six years, with the remaining years being contracted to an ESPN Events-owned bowl. Additionally, the contract contains a clause that allows Army the ability to accept a bid from a different bowl game once during the three-year agreement with the Independence Bowl and once during the three-year agreement with ESPN Events. Aligning with this, on November 5 Army announced that it had agreed to a secondary contractual tie-in with the Duke's Mayo Bowl. It agreed that it would serve as the primary backup for the bowl and would have the opportunity to accept an invitation to the game twice during the six-year cycle. The Duke's Mayo Bowl's primary tie-ins for the 2020–2025 cycle are the ACC (all years), the SEC (odd years), and the Big Ten (even years); if any of those conferences were unable to place a team into the bowl during any of those years, Army would be extended an invitation to fill their place. The opponent conferences for the Independence Bowl were announced to be the Pac-12 and the American on January 30, 2020.

The Duke's Mayo Bowl can extend an invitation to Army once during the even years (2020, 2022, 2026) and once during the odd years (2021, 2023, 2025) to fill a vacancy as part of a secondary tie-in.

ESPN Events operates the following 16 bowls that Army could be invited to during odd years of the cycle:
 Armed Forces Bowl 
 Birmingham Bowl
 Bahamas Bowl
 Boca Raton Bowl
 Camellia Bowl
 Cure Bowl
 Famous Idaho Potato Bowl
 Fenway Bowl
 First Responder Bowl
 Frisco Bowl
 Gasparilla Bowl
 Hawaii Bowl
 Las Vegas Bowl
 Myrtle Beach Bowl
 New Mexico Bowl
 Texas Bowl

Head coaches

† Dennis Michie coached 1 game in 1890, and then coached a full season in 1892.

Rivalries

Commander-in-Chief's Trophy

Air Force, Army, and Navy have played each other every year since 1972 for the Commander-in Chief's Trophy. Air Force leads the FBS service academies with 21 victories, Navy has 16 victories, and Army has 9 victories, with the trophy being shared 4 times. Air Force is the current holder of the trophy.

Air Force
Air Force and Army meet annually and vie for the Commander-in-Chief's Trophy. Air Force leads Army 37–18–1 through the 2021 season.

After the Navy–Notre Dame game was canceled in 2020, the Army–Air Force game became the longest uninterrupted intersectional rivalry in college football.

Navy

Army and Navy play each other annually in the Army–Navy game, which is also a part of the Commander-in-Chief's Trophy. This series is one of the oldest and traditional rivalries in the NCAA. They first met in 1890, and have played each other annually since 1930. The games are generally played at a neutral site. Navy leads the series 62–53–7 through the 2021 season.

Notre Dame

Notre Dame is a rivalry which some feel has fallen into obscurity. In much of the early 20th century, Army and Notre Dame were considered football powerhouses, and met 34 times between 1913 and 1947. Though the rivalry has slowed down, they last met in 2016. Many media members considered the 1946 contest to be the "Game of the Century". Notre Dame leads the series 39–8–4 through the 2018 season.

Michie Stadium

Michie Stadium is the home stadium of the Army Black Knights in West Point, New York, which was opened in 1924. The stadium is named after the first Army football head coach, Dennis Michie. In 1999 the field was renamed Blaik Field at Michie Stadium in honor of Former Coach Earl Blaik.

It was rated as Sports Illustrateds #3 sports venue of the 20th century.

Traditions
Songs

Alma Mater is the Army's school song. Army's fight song is On, Brave Old Army Team. Army also plays other organized cheers; Army Rocket Yell, Black, Gold, and Gray, and USMA Cheer.

Mascot

Army's mascots are the Army Mules. While dating back to 1899, they were officially adopted as mascots by USMA in 1936.

College Football Hall of Fame

The following 4 individuals have been inducted into the College Football Hall of Fame as coaches.

The following 24 individuals have been inducted into the College Football Hall of Fame as players. Daly and McEwan also served as Army's head coach.

Other notable players

President of the United States and General of the Army Dwight D. Eisenhower and General of the Army Omar Bradley were on the 1912 Army football team. Eisenhower was injured and his football career was over by 1913, when the two future generals were juniors. Bradley, a star of the Army baseball team for four years, was on the field in 1913 when Notre Dame upset Army in a historic college football game in which the forward pass was used for the first time. Bradley played end opposite the legendary Knute Rockne, the Notre Dame end who later coached the Irish to national championships before dying in a plane crash near Bazaar, Kansas, on Easter Friday in 1931.

Retired numbers

Award winners
Heisman Trophy
Doc Blanchard – 1945
Glenn Davis – 1946
Pete Dawkins – 1958
AFCA Coach of the Year
Earl Blaik – 1946
Tom Cahill – 1966
Eddie Robinson Coach of the Year
Tom Cahill – 1966
Bobby Dodd Coach of the Year
Bob Sutton – 1996
George Munger Collegiate Coach of the Year
Jeff Monken – 2018
Vince Lombardi College Football Coach of the Year
Jeff Monken – 2018
President's Award
Jeff Monken – 2018
ECAC Division I FBS Football Coach of the Year
Jeff Monken – 2021
Maxwell Award
Glenn Davis – 1944
Doc Blanchard – 1945
Pete Dawkins – 1958
Outland Trophy
Joe Steffy – 1947
William V. Campbell Trophy
Andrew Rodriguez – 2011
James E. Sullivan Award
Doc Blanchard 1945
Arnold Tucker 1946
Andrew Rodriguez – 2011
Defender of the Nation Award
Andrew King – 2016
Arik Smith – 2021

Future schedules
Schedules as of November 10, 2022.

 At FedExField, Landover, MD
 At M&T Bank Stadium, Baltimore, MD
 At MetLife Stadium, East Rutherford, NJ
 At Lincoln Financial Field, Philadelphia, PA
 At TBD

Army has games against Tulsa in 2025 and BYU in 2032 with dates yet to be announced.

Radio
Radio rights are held by the Army Sports Network.

Current broadcast team
Army Sports Network
Rich DeMarco (play-by-play)
Dean Darling (color analyst)
Tony Morino (sideline reporter)
Joe Beckerle (pre and post-game)

See also
 Emerald Isle Classic

References

Bibliography

External links

 

 
American football teams established in 1890
1890 establishments in New York (state)

es:Army Black Knights